The 2012 season was Jeonbuk Hyundai Motors' nineteenth season in the K-League in South Korea. Jeonbuk Hyundai Motors is competing K-League, Korean FA Cup and AFC Champions League.

Current squad

Out on loan

Transfer

In

Out

Coaching staff

Match results

K-League

All times are Korea Standard Time (KST) – UTC+9

League table

Results summary

Results by round

Korean FA Cup

AFC Champions League

Group stage

Squad statistics

Appearances
Statistics accurate as of match played 27 June 2012

Goals and assists

Discipline

References

Jeonbuk Hyundai Motors
2012